The 1887 St. Louis Browns season was the team's sixth season in St. Louis, Missouri, and the sixth season in the American Association. The Browns went 95–40 during the season and finished first in the American Association, winning their third pennant in a row. The team amassed 581 stolen bases, the most for any team whose records are recognized by Major League Baseball (MLB). In a postseason series (now referred to as the 1887 World Series), the Browns played the National League champion Detroit Wolverines, losing the series 10 games to 5.

Regular season

Drawing the color line in baseball

Racial segregation started to become a custom in baseball about the time that eight members of the Browns withdrew from playing exhibition game in September against the Cuban Giants, a prominent 'colored' team.  During this time, it was a popular practice to refer to teams of African American players as Cuban, Hispanic, or Arabian to deflect the racial stigma of the time, even though many were predominantly none of the three.  News accounts reported that "for the first time in the history of base ball the color line has been drawn, and that by the St. Louis Browns, who have established the precedent that white players must not play with colored men."

The Browns were in Philadelphia with plans to travel to New York City to play the Cuban Giants in an exhibition game.  Scheduled long in advance with a "big guarantee", a crowd was anticipated in excess of 15,000 spectators.  However, the night before departure to New York, eight Browns players signed a letter addressed to owner Chris von der Ahe and delivered it in person.  The letter read:

The letter was signed by eight players: Arlie Latham, Jack Boyle, Tip O'Neill, Bob Caruthers, Bill Gleason, Yank Robinson, Silver King, and Curt Welch. Manager and first baseman Charlie Comiskey was reportedly unaware of the letter and Ed Knouff refused to sign it.  The Cuban Giants had previously played numerous exhibition games against other 'white' teams including Chicago, Indianapolis, Detroit, Louisville, Philadelphia.  This was the first reported account that any club refused to play them because of their race.

The cancellation of the game with the Cuban Giants was merely symptomatic of a larger trend occurring in professional baseball.  The boycott occurred during the same season in which Cap Anson of the Chicago White Stockings threatened not to play any 'white' professional teams who hired black players and just months after the International League prohibited further signing of black players.  Clearly the tide was moving toward segregation in baseball, so the St. Louis Browns' withdrawal brought wider attention to what was to become a norm in the United States.  Ironically, it would be by an act 60 years later by then-former Cardinals executive in Branch Rickey that broke the color barrier in MLB when he débuted Jackie Robinson in 1947 with the Brooklyn Dodgers.

Season standings

Record vs. opponents

Roster

Player stats

Batting

Starters by position 
Note: Pos = Position; G = Games played; AB = At bats; H = Hits; Avg. = Batting average; HR = Home runs; RBI = Runs batted in

Other batters 
Note: G = Games played; AB = At bats; H = Hits; Avg. = Batting average; HR = Home runs; RBI = Runs batted in

Pitching

Starting pitchers 
Note: G = Games pitched; IP = Innings pitched; W = Wins; L = Losses; ERA = Earned run average; SO = Strikeouts

Relief pitchers 
Note: G = Games pitched; W = Wins; L = Losses; SV = Saves; ERA = Earned run average; SO = Strikeouts

References

External links
1887 St. Louis Browns at Baseball Reference
1887 St. Louis Browns team page at www.baseball-almanac.com

St. Louis Cardinals seasons
Saint Louis Browns season
St Louis